Turducken is a dish consisting of a deboned chicken stuffed into a deboned duck, further stuffed into a deboned turkey. Outside of the United States and Canada, it is known as a three-bird roast. Gooducken is an English variant, replacing turkey with goose.

The word turducken is a portmanteau combining turkey, duck, and chicken. The dish is a form of engastration, which is a recipe method in which one animal is stuffed inside the gastric passage of another—twofold in this instance.

The thoracic cavity of the chicken/game hen and the rest of the gaps are stuffed, sometimes with a highly seasoned breadcrumb mixture or sausage meat, although some versions have a different stuffing for each bird. The result is a fairly solid layered poultry dish, suitable for cooking by braising, roasting, grilling, or barbecuing.

The turducken was popularized in America by John Madden, who promoted the unusual dish during NFL Thanksgiving Day games and, later, Monday Night Football broadcasts. On one occasion, the commentator sawed through a turducken with his bare hand, live in the booth, to demonstrate the turducken's contents. Madden ate his first on-air turducken on December 1, 1996, during a game between the New Orleans Saints and St. Louis Rams at the Superdome.

Origin 
Credit for the creation of the turducken is uncertain, though it is generally agreed to have been popularized by Cajun chef Paul Prudhomme. The most common claimant is Hebert's Specialty Meats in Maurice, Louisiana, whose owners Junior and Sammy Hebert say they created it in 1985 "when a local man brought his own birds to their shop and asked the brothers to create the medley".

In the United Kingdom, a turducken is a type of ballotine called a "three-bird roast" or a "royal roast". The Pure Meat Company offered a five-bird roast (a goose, a turkey, a chicken, a pheasant, and a pigeon, stuffed with sausage), described as a modern revival of the traditional Yorkshire Christmas pie, in 1989; and a three-bird roast (a duck stuffed with chicken stuffed with a pigeon, with sage and apple stuffing) in 1990.

Gooducken is a goose stuffed with a duck, which is in turn stuffed with a chicken.

Historical predecessors
In his 1807 Almanach des Gourmands, gastronomist Grimod de La Reynière presents his rôti sans pareil ("roast without equal")—a bustard stuffed with a turkey, a goose, a pheasant, a chicken, a duck, a guinea fowl, a teal, a woodcock, a partridge, a plover, a lapwing, a quail, a thrush, a lark, an ortolan bunting and a garden warbler—although he states that, since similar roasts were produced by ancient Romans, the rôti sans pareil was not entirely novel. The final bird is very small but large enough to just hold an olive; it also suggests that, unlike modern multi-bird roasts, there was no stuffing or other packing placed in between the birds.

An early form of the recipe was "Pandora's cushion", a goose stuffed with a chicken stuffed with a quail.

Another version of the dish is credited to French diplomat and gourmand Charles Maurice de Talleyrand-Périgord. The 1891 newspaper article French Legends Of The Table offers Quail à la Talleyrand:

In Hunan cuisine, the famed chef Liu Sanhe from Changsha invented a dish called sanceng taoji, meaning "three-layer set chicken", consisting of a sparrow inside a pigeon inside a hen, along with medicinal herbs such as Gastrodia elata and wolfberries. He originally devised the dish to alleviate Lu Diping's ill concubine of headaches.
The book Passion India: The Story of the Spanish Princess of Kapurthula (p. 295) features a section that recounts a similar dish in India in the late 1800s:

See also
 Cockentrice
 List of duck dishes
 List of meat dishes
 Whole stuffed camel

References

External links

"Farm creates £665 multibird roast". BBC News. December 30, 2007

"Turducken".

Louisiana cuisine
Poultry dishes
Stuffed dishes
American poultry dishes